Paul Ray Smith (September 24, 1969 – April 4, 2003) was a United States Army soldier who was posthumously awarded the Medal of Honor for his actions during the 2003 invasion of Iraq. While serving with B Company, 11th Engineer Battalion, 3rd Infantry Division in Baghdad, his team was attacked by a group of Iraqi insurgents and after a firefight he was killed by Iraqi fire. For his actions during this battle he was awarded the Medal of Honor. Two years later, the medal, along with the newly approved Medal of Honor flag, were presented to his family on behalf of him; specifically to his eleven-year-old son David, at a White House ceremony by President George W. Bush.

Early life and education
Smith was born on September 24, 1969, in El Paso, Texas, to Ivan Smith and Janice Pvirre, but when he was nine the family moved to Tampa, Florida. As a child he attended public schools and enjoyed sports, especially American football. He also liked riding skateboards and bicycles, playing pranks with his friends and younger sister Lisa. In high school he became interested in carpentry, even finding a part-time job as a carpenter's assistant. He also liked to work on cars, especially old ones, and enjoyed taking things apart to see how they worked, even restoring a dune buggy with a friend. In 1989 he graduated from Tampa Bay Vocational Tech High School and shortly thereafter joined the United States Army in October 1989.

Military career
Smith was sent to Basic Training at Fort Leonard Wood, Missouri before being sent to Germany for his first duty station, where he joined the 9th Engineer Battalion. Later, he served during the Gulf War. He deployed with B company in October 1996 as part of the 2nd Brigade Combat Team, the covering force for Operation Joint Endeavor and Operation Joint Guardian; the battalion returned to Schweinfurt in April 1997.  In 1999 he was posted to the 11th Engineer Battalion, with which he was deployed to Kosovo in May 2001, where he was responsible for daily presence patrols in the town of Gnjilane. In the spring of 2002, he received a promotion to sergeant first class and completed the Advanced Non-Commissioned Officer Course in August 2002.

As part of the 2003 invasion of Iraq, he was assigned to B Company, 11th Engineer Battalion of the 3rd Infantry Division.

Medal of Honor action
Smith's company was supporting the 2nd Battalion, 7th Infantry Regiment as it made its way through the Karbala Gap, across the Euphrates River and to Saddam International Airport (BIAP) in Baghdad. On April 4, 2003, a 100-man force was assigned to block the highway between Baghdad and the airport, about one mile east of the airport. After a brief battle, several of the Iraqis were captured. Smith spotted a walled enclosure nearby with a tower overlooking it. He and his squad set about building an impromptu enemy prisoner of war (EPW) holding area in the enclosure. Smith and 16 other men used an Armored Combat Earthmover (similar to a bulldozer) to knock a hole in the south wall of the courtyard. On the north side, there was a metal gate that Smith assigned several men to guard. These men noticed 50–100 Iraqi fighters who had taken positions in trenches just beyond the gate. He summoned a Bradley fighting vehicle to attack their position. Three nearby M113 Armored Personnel Carriers came to support the attack. An M113 was hit, possibly by a mortar, and all three crewmen were wounded. The Bradley, damaged and running low on ammunition, withdrew to reload during a lull in the battle. Smith organized the evacuation of the injured M113 crewmen. However, behind the courtyard was a military aid station crowded with 100 combat casualties. To protect it from being overrun, Smith chose to fight on rather than withdraw with the wounded.

Meanwhile, some Iraqi fighters had taken position in the tower overlooking the courtyard, just over the west wall. The Iraqis now had the Americans in the courtyard under an intense crossfire. Smith took command of the M113 and ordered a driver to position it so that he could attack both the tower and the trenches. He manned the M113's machine gun, going through three boxes of ammunition. A separate team led by First Sergeant Tim Campbell attacked the tower from the rear, killing the Iraqis. As the battle ended, Smith's machine gun fell silent. His comrades found him slumped in the turret hatch. His armored vest was peppered with 13 bullet holes, the vest's ceramic armor inserts, both front and back, cracked in numerous places (the M113 he was manning was not fitted with protective ACAV gun shields which had been standard since the Vietnam War, later in the Iraq conflict, modern gunshields were fielded). However, the fatal shot, one of the last from the tower, had entered his neck and passed through his brain, killing him.

Before deploying to Iraq, Smith had written to his parents, saying "There are two ways to come home, stepping off the plane and being carried off the plane. It doesn't matter how I come home, because I am prepared to give all that I am to ensure that all my boys make it home." Smith was cremated and his ashes were scattered in the Gulf of Mexico, where he loved to fish.

He has a memorial marker in Arlington National Cemetery Arlington, Virginia and his marker can be found in memorial Section MD, lot 67. He also has a memorial at his high school outside of the school's Navy Junior ROTC building.

At the time of his death Smith had served in the United States Army for thirteen years, and for his actions during the battle, he posthumously received the Medal of Honor. On April 4, 2005, exactly two years after he was killed, his eleven-year-old son David received the Medal of Honor on behalf of his father from President George W. Bush, along with a Medal of Honor flag.

Personal life
Smith was survived by his wife Birgit, son David and stepdaughter Jessica.

Awards and decorations

SFC Smith also earned the German Marksmanship Badge and French Armed Forces Commando Badge.

Medal of Honor citation

For conspicuous gallantry and intrepidity at the risk of his life above and beyond the call of duty:

Other honors
In 2006, he was posthumously awarded the De Fleury Medal (Gold Medal) from the United States Army Corps of Engineers presented by Lieutenant General Carl A. Strock who was, at the time, the Chief of Engineers.
The Counter Explosive Hazards Center school house in Fort Leonard Wood, MO is named in Smith's honor.
The U.S. Post Office in Holiday, Florida, and the United States Army Simulation and Training Technology Center in Orlando, Florida have been named in his honor.
New middle schools were named in honor in Holiday, Florida on August 25, 2006, as well as one in Tampa, Florida Sgt. Paul R. Smith Middle School on August 18, 2008, and in his hometown of Tampa, Florida, on April 27, 2009. 
Smith is also honored in the America's Army Game with information about him and a simulation of his battle.
The couple's Saint Christopher medal and wedding bands are also embedded in the ship's mast.
New fitness centers at Fort Benning and Fort Stewart, Georgia, as well as one in Camp Victory, Baghdad, Iraq are named in his honor.
The education center at Fort Stewart is named in his honor.
Smith's last battle is mentioned in the non-fiction book Weapons. Key Weapons & Weapon Systems from 1860 to the Present.

See also

List of Medal of Honor recipients

References

External links

 (requires subscription).

1969 births
2003 deaths
United States Army personnel of the Gulf War
United States Army personnel of the Iraq War
American military personnel killed in the Iraq War
United States Army Medal of Honor recipients
People from El Paso, Texas
United States Army soldiers
Burials at Arlington National Cemetery
Iraq War recipients of the Medal of Honor
United States Army personnel of the Kosovo War